A. robusta  may refer to:
 Actinella robusta, an air-breathing land snail species endemic to Portugal
 Aganippe robusta, a spider species in the genus Aganippe found in South Australia
 Agathis robusta, the Queensland kauri or smooth-barked kauri, a coniferous tree species native to eastern Queensland, Australia
 Alasmidonta robusta, the Carolina elktoe, an extinct freshwater mussel species endemic to the United States
 Ammannia robusta, the grand redstem, a flowering plant species native to most of western and central North America
 Anacampta robusta, a picture-winged fly species
 Aniba robusta, a plant species endemic to Venezuela
 Antistia robusta, a praying mantis species
 Arachnothera robusta, the Long-billed Spiderhunter, a bird species found in Brunei, Indonesia, Malaysia and Thailand
 Austrochaperina robusta, the robust frog, a frog species endemic to Australia

See also
 Robusta (disambiguation)